The Woman in the Case is a 1916 American silent drama film produced by the Famous Players Film Company and distributed through Paramount Pictures. Hugh Ford directed star Pauline Frederick as Margaret Rolfe. Clyde Fitch's 1905 play of the same name is the source material for this production and on Broadway the Margaret Rolfe role was played by Blanche Walsh. An Australian film of the same name based on Fitch's play was also produced in 1916 and is now lost. This American film, recently rediscovered in a European archive, survives but is missing the last reel.

Filmed again by Paramount in 1922 as The Law and the Woman with Betty Compson and as a talkie in 1932 as The Wiser Sex.

Cast
 Pauline Frederick - Margaret Rolfe
 Marie Chambers - Claire Foster
 Alan Hale - Julian Rolfe
 Paul Gordon - Philip Long
 George Larkin - ?
 Clarence Handyside - ?
 Mrs. C. Pettengill - ?

References

External links

1916 films
American silent feature films
Films directed by Hugh Ford
American films based on plays
Paramount Pictures films
1916 drama films
Silent American drama films
American black-and-white films
1910s rediscovered films
Rediscovered American films
1910s English-language films
1910s American films